Tomorrow is a South Korean television series directed by Kim Tae-yoon and Sung Chi-wook, starring Kim Hee-sun, Rowoon, Lee Soo-hyuk, and Yoon Ji-on. Based on a Naver webtoon that was published in 2017, the series is about the angels of the underworld who used to guide the dead, but now save those who want to die. It premiered on MBC TV on April 1, 2022, and aired every Friday and Saturday at 21:50 (KST) with 16 episodes. It is also available for streaming on Netflix.

Synopsis 
Choi Jun-woong (Rowoon) is a young job seeker who is unable to secure a job. Through an accident, he meets the grim reapers Koo Ryeon (Kim Hee-sun) and Lim Ryung Gu (Yoon Ji-on) who have the task of preventing suicide, and works with them as the youngest contract worker in the crisis management team of death angels.

Cast

Main 
 Kim Hee-sun as Koo Ryeon
 Kal So-won as young Koo Ryeon
 A grim reaper and the leader of the crisis management team of Jumadeung. Park Joong-Gil’s wife in her past life. 
 Rowoon as Choi Joon-woong
 Kim Ra-on as young Choi Joon-woong
 A young job seeker and new contract employee of Jumadeung.
 Lee Soo-hyuk as Park Joong-gil
 Park Sang-hoon as young Park Joong-gil 
 The leader of the Grim Reaper management team who guides the dead in Jumadeung, and is a strict principled person. Koo Ryeon’s husband in his previous life.
 Yoon Ji-on as Lim Ryung-gu
 Seo Yoon-hyuk as young Lim Ryung-gu
 The assistant manager of the crisis management team of Jumadeung.
 Kim Hae-sook as The Jade Emperor
 The director at Jumadeung, the underworld monopoly.

Supporting

People related to Jumadeung 
 Moon Seo-yoon as Jeon Su-in
 A member of the Grim Reaper management team of Jumadeung.
 Kim Nu-ri as Jang Jae-hee
 A member of the Grim Reaper management team of Jumadeung.

People around Choi Joon-woong 
Yoon Yoo-sun as Jeong-im, Choi Joon-woong's mother
Kim Seo-yeon as Choi Min-yeong, Joon-woong's younger sister.
 Kwon Hyuk as Joon Woong's father

Extended 

 Noh Eun-bi's incident (Ep. 1–2)
 Jo In as Noh Eun-bi 
 A workaholic television playwright who is a victim of school violence.
 Kim Chae-eun as Kim Hye-won
 A popular webtoon writer who is the perpetrator of school violence.
 Jung Yun-sol as Kwon Dan-ah, Noh Eun-bi's friend.
 Seo Young-bin as a producer of TV station where Noh Eun-bi works.
 Jang Ji-eun as a friend of Kim Hye-won.
 Sun Arin as a friend of Kim Hye-won.

 Namgoong Jae-su's incident (Ep. 3–4)
Ryu Sung-rok as Namgoong Jae-su, Joon-woong's close friend.
 Kim Ji-hoon as young Namgoong Jae-su
 Kim Kyung-min as Namgoong Hyun, Namgoong Jae-su's father
 Im Sae-byeok as Namgoong Jae-su's mother
 Kwak Ja-hyung as Kim Woong-jun, Joon-woong's another face.

 Kang Woo-jin's incident (Ep. 4–5)
 Kang Seung-yoon as Kang Woo-jin, a singer-songwriter
 Shin Seo-woo as young Kang Woo-jin
 Lee No-ah as Heo Na-young 
 Kang Woo-jin's wife who died in an accident.
 Min Eung-Sik as Heo Na-young's father
 Kang Joo-Hee as Heo Na-young's mother

 Lee Young-cheon's incident (Ep. 6)
 Jeon Moo-song as Lee Young-cheon, former Korean War Veteran. 
 Lee Jung-jun as young Lee Young-cheon
 Jung Chung-gu as owner of the junkyard
 Lee Kyu-Seop as a gangster
 Kim Jeong-cheol as Kim Dong-shil, Lee Young-cheon's fellow soldier in the battlefield

 Shin Ye-na's incident (Ep. 7)
 Han Hae-in as Shin Ye-na, an employee at SP beauty marketing team
 Kim Min-so as Jung Bo-ram, an employee at SP beauty marketing team
 Kim Heung-rae as SP beauty marketing team leader
 Yang Jae-hyun as Kim Yong-jun, an employee at SP beauty
 Jo Seung-yeon as Lee Dong-ja, a working mother
 Noh Ha-yeon as Yewon, Lee Dong-ja's daughter.

 Suicide Broker's incident (Ep. 8)
 Min Jin-woong as Song Jin-ho (a.k.a. Betamale)
 Jung Se-Hyun as Sunset
 Shin Chi-Young as Goodbye

 Kim Kong's incident (Ep. 9)
 Kim Kong, an old dog who doesn't have much time left and ran away from home
 Cha Hak-yeon as Kim Hoon, the owner of Kong
 Lee Kyung-hoon as young Kim Hoon

 Twin siblings' incident (Ep. 10)
 Gong Jae-hyun as Cha Yoon-jae, the twin brother of a sexual assault victim. 
 Lee Ji-won as Cha Yoon-hee, Yoon Jae's twin sister, the victim of sexual assault. 
 Kim Jun-kyung as Tak Nam-il, a medical student and the perpetrator of sexual assault. 

 Im Yu-hwa's incident (Ep. 11–12)
 Min Ji-ah as Lim Yu-hwa
 Jeon Eun-joo as young Lim Yu-hwa (last incarnation)
 A woman who lost her newborn child. She was Lim Ryung-gu's mother in her previous life.
 Lee Ki-hyuk as Park Hae-il, Lim Yu-hwa's husband
 Jung Soo-han as Kwon Sang-soo, an employee at Jumadeung's sales department

 Yoo Bok-hee's incident (Ep. 13)
 Kim Yong-rim as Yoo Bok-hee
Park Yoon-young as young Yoo-Bok-hee
 A woman who thinks her friend Yun-i became a comfort woman due to her fault.
 Kim Young-ok as Lee Jeong-moo
 Han Ji-hyo as young Lee Jeong-moo
 A comfort woman victim of Japanese army who knows about Yun-i.
 Park Hee-jeong as Jeon Bo-yun / Yun-i
 Lee Seo-yeon as Yun-i
 A newly employed Grim Reaper at management team of Jumadeung. She was Yun-i, Yoo Bok-hee's friend in her previous life.

Koo Ryeon's past life (Ep. 14)
 Koo Si-yeon as Gop-dan, Koo Ryeon's personal maid
 Kim Si-eun as young Gop-dan
 Jung Jae-eun as Koo Ryeon's mother-in-law
 Ha Dong-joon as Koo Ryeon's father

 Ryu Cho-hui's incident (Ep.15–16)
 Kim Si-eun as Ryu Cho-hui, a popular idol actress. She was Koo Ryeon's maid, Gop-dan in her previous life.
 Lee Hye-won as Park Song-yi, a member of girl group Ravina. She is in a conflict with Ryu Cho-hui.
 Kang Joo-eun as Ryu Cho-hui's younger sister
 Shin Jun-chul as Ryu Cho-hui's father

Special appearances 
 Jeong Jun-ha as Chief Jeong, Noh Eun-bi's favorite comedian (Ep. 1–2) 
 Bae Jeong-nam as a scammer (Ep. 1) 
 Ryu Hye-rin as Scammer (Ep. 3)
 Park Hoon as Ha Dae-soo, King Yeomra the Great – the king of the hell (Ep.15–16)

Production 
On January 18, 2022, the script reading site was revealed by releasing photos.

Original soundtrack

Part 1

Part 2

Part 3

Part 4

Part 5

Ratings

References

External links 
  
 
 
 
 

2022 South Korean television series debuts 
2022 South Korean television series endings
MBC TV television dramas
Television series by Studio N (Naver)
Korean-language Netflix exclusive international distribution programming
Television shows based on South Korean webtoons
South Korean fantasy television series